The Top Gear test track is used by the BBC automotive television programme Top Gear. It is located at Dunsfold Aerodrome in Surrey, United Kingdom. The track was designed by Lotus Cars as a testing facility, with many of its Formula One cars tested there. It is used to test both cars and drivers seen on the programme, mainly in Power Laps and Star in a ... Car.

For the 23rd series of Top Gear the track was expanded with a rallycross section for the "Star in a Rallycross Car" segment, but it was abandoned at the end of series 23.

In December 2016 planning permission was granted for 1,800 homes to be built on the current site of the aerodrome. As part of the redevelopment, it was proposed that the track (and associated aerodrome infrastructure such as the runway drag strip) was to be demolished.

Layout
The track is on a former Royal Canadian Air Force airbase constructed during the Second World War and later used by British Aerospace (and its predecessors) as a manufacturing and test facility. The track's main route, marked by painted lines and simple structures such as stacks of tyres, was designed by test drivers from Lotus. The layout of the track is designed to put the car through various conditions, ranging from provoking understeer to testing brake balance and tyres. It is considered to be an equaliser for cars since, according to Richard Hammond, both 0–60 miles per hour (0–96.6 km/h) times and top speed are totally meaningless. The track also incorporates a drag strip; although this is not used for timed segments, it does feature in some challenges and other features on the show.

The course starts on the perimeter road outside the Top Gear studio. The first bend is a fast right-left kink named "Crooner Curves." "Willson Bend" is the first proper turn on the track and the first corner usually seen when The Stig is lapping a car. "Chicago", a long right-hand around a tyre wall onto the main runway, was designed by Lotus as a steady state corner, designed to highlight understeer or oversteer of the chassis. Next is "Hammerhead", a left-then-right corner, which again highlights understeer and oversteer. The track comes to a right-hand curve, then the course turns right through the flat-out section called the "Follow Through" (it resembles turns 11 and 12 of the Albert Park Circuit). After the left hand "Bentley Bend" named after the person who first "discovered" Jeremy Clarkson and former Top Gear presenter, Jon Bentley, but commonly referred to simply as "the tyres", the course comes to "Bacharach Bend", which, after the first series, has been referred to as the "Penultimate Corner" or the "Second-to-last Corner" and is often regarded as one of the most challenging on the course. The final turn before the finish line is "Gambon" in honour of Sir Michael Gambon, who completed the turn on two wheels in episode 8 of Series 1. Prior to this, the corner was known as "Carpenters Corner".

Usage
The track is used routinely for the Star in a Reasonably-Priced Car and Power Laps segments on Top Gear. It also serves myriad roles in other portions of the programme, especially in testing cars and in challenges. When testing cars, they are often driven around the airfield by the presenters.  Afterwards, they are taken around the test track by The Stig to set a lap time.  Occasionally, drag races and speed tests are held on the runway.

Cars acquired during challenges must often post lap times (driven by either one of the presenters or The Stig) around the track against either a target time or a time set by The Stig in another vehicle.  During many challenges, the track is used in more unorthodox fashions — for instance, serving as a makeshift motorway lane during a challenge testing tailgating prowess with vans.

Power Laps

Power Laps is a segment of the programme in which The Stig completes a lap around the track in a reviewed car to compare its performance to previous contenders.

To be eligible to appear on the Power Lap Times board, a vehicle must be a road-legal production car and must have sufficient ride height to clear a standard speed bump, although occasionally vehicles that do not qualify to appear on the list are still timed. Whenever a non-qualifying vehicle is raced, the time is compared to the official Power Laps but then removed from the board, for example—the Ferrari FXX owned by Michael Schumacher (1:10.7) was taken off the board after because it both failed to meet road legal standards and used slick tyres.

All laps are timed with the car's manufacturer-provided adjustable settings configured for maximum performance—all adjustable suspensions are set at their most efficient, all gear shift maps are at their most aggressive, and driving aids such as traction control are deactivated. Lap times do not offer complete comparisons between the cars, mainly because wet or otherwise poor weather conditions (see time deductions below) can negatively affect lap times.

The Power Board

Due to the size of the list, only the top 20 are shown. See List of Top Gear test track Power Lap Times for the full list.

The second most powerful production car ever featured on Top Gear, the 1001 PS (987 bhp; 736 kW) Bugatti Veyron, was taken around the track by The Stig in Series 12, Episode 4, after 3 years of waiting. In Series 15 Episode 5 however, the Stig took the 1,200 PS Super Sport version around the track in 1:16.8, thus setting a new lap record.

For the 1:17.6 lap, the Koenigsegg CCX was fitted with an optional rear spoiler to provide downforce after The Stig spun the unmodified version off the track.  The Stig allegedly recommended this modification, correctly predicting that the car would then be the fastest ever round the track, although Koenigsegg stated that the improvement was due to other adjustments.

Lap times of non-qualifying vehicles
A "non-qualifying" vehicle is one that does not meet the presenters' requirements to remain on the board; that is, one that is not a "road car", which according to Top Gear means being: available to buy, fully road-legal (lights, indicators, registration, profile tyres, etc.), and street-worthy (i.e. able to negotiate a speed bump).

The Caparo, Radical, and Westfield are road-legal in the UK but are unable to clear a speed bump. According to Caparo, the car driven by Top Gear was a prototype that did not feature the adjustable ride height found on the production model. Because The Stig set his time in the non-adjustable prototype and the production version has not been driven around the track, the Caparo's time remains ineligible for the Power Lap board.

Non-Top Gear laps
Occasionally attempts at the Power Lap record are made without the support of the BBC. The following laps of Dunsfold were recorded, filmed and promoted independently of the Top Gear television programme.

Ultima say that their motive for running a non-televised lap was that they felt that the GTR was being specifically ignored by the producers of Top Gear.

Star in a Reasonably Priced Car (series 1–22)
"Star in a Reasonably Priced Car" was a recurring segment on Top Gear. During most programmes, a celebrity (usually, but not exclusively of British fame) is interviewed by Jeremy Clarkson. Discussion is normally amusing, and focuses on car-related matters, such as the celebrity's car history. Then Clarkson and the studio audience watch the guest's fastest lap on the Top Gear test track, after which Clarkson puts the celebrity's time on the time board.

Suzuki Liana (2002–2006)

For the first seven series the car driven for lap times was a Suzuki Liana. When first introduced, the car was worth £9995. The car used is stock except for a roll cage and racing seats added as safety measures. Each guest practises with The Stig before making several attempts to complete the test track in the fastest time. The guest does not learn their time until the interview. Practice laps, crashes and the drivers' facial expressions are also shown during the segment.

The two slowest laps on the Liana celebrity list are held by Terry Wogan and Richard Whiteley, both of whom were beaten by Billy Baxter, a blind Bosnian war veteran. He guided the Liana through the track under direction from Clarkson in the passenger seat in a time of 2 minutes 2 seconds, which was 1.4 seconds quicker than Terry Wogan, and 4 seconds faster than Richard Whiteley.

The fastest non-professional driver was Ellen MacArthur. Unlike most contenders she made no comments to the camera during her lap. She completed the lap in 1 minute 46.7 seconds, beating Jimmy Carr by 0.2 seconds. The current fastest professional driver in the Liana is Daniel Ricciardo with 1:42.2.

The Liana endured considerable abuse from the stars while undertaking their laps. In one incident, actor Michael Gambon clipped the final corner, taking the car onto two wheels. It was done in such a spectacular fashion that the corner was named "Gambon Corner". When Lionel Richie drove the Liana, one of the front wheels fell off, invoking Clarkson to coin the term "pulling a Lionel". Trevor Eve also lost a wheel. The former British transport minister Stephen Ladyman added further injury to the Liana by denting the boot when he lost control during practice and slid backwards into a tyre wall. David Soul destroyed the gearbox of two Lianas during his time on the show due to his rough driving style. Patrick Kielty broke the Liana's front suspension during series 4 when he drove on the grass. Christopher Eccleston was the only celebrity to use a Liana with an automatic transmission, because a hesitant Eccleston admitted he was "only qualified to drive an automatic." To accommodate his needs, Top Gear succeeded in borrowing an automatic Liana, of which only 40 existed in the UK. As a reference to his role in Doctor Who, the automatic Liana was shown materialising onto the racing track, with a TARDIS materialisation sound effect played over it.

The Liana has also been modified on several occasions. David Soul's Liana featured a red police light and a white stripe in reference to his Starsky and Hutch role. Johnny Vegas was provided with L-plates as he had not passed his driving test at the time. When Justin Hawkins came on the show, the Liana he drove had flame decals pasted on it. Actor Sanjeev Bhaskar had an ornate tissue box placed in the back, a homage to Indian drivers.

In its service, the Liana covered 1,600 laps of the circuit; went through 400 tyres; its brakes were changed 100 times; and it required six new clutches, two new hubs, driveshafts, wishbones, struts and gear linkages and a replacement wing mirror.

In July 2005, Formula One driver Damon Hill appeared on the show for the first time as the star. This was kept a surprise to the audience and the viewing public, and when Nigel Mansell came on the show, it was covered up in magazines and on the internet by saying that the Star in a Reasonably Priced Car would be Alan Titchmarsh. Since Mansell's appearance the Liana has remained in use as a vehicle reserved for Formula 1 drivers.

For some of the laps more than one person has been present in the car. This was the case for Clarkson's run when he had both Hammond and Jason Dawe in the car. Trinny and Susannah were both in the car for each other's runs. Denise Van Outen was in the car when Johnny Vaughan did his lap; Van Outen never did a lap driving the car. Clarkson was also present as a navigator for Billy Baxter's laps.

Liana leaderboard

Chevrolet Lacetti (2006–2010)
Starting with the eighth series the Liana was replaced by a Chevrolet Lacetti and a new blank scoreboard. The format was changed so that each star would have five practice laps, and then a final timed lap, with no allowance being given for mishaps.

As a starter for the new car and format, an open day was held for any celebrity who wanted to take part. Seven stars recorded times that day: James Hewitt (who Jeremy and Richard referred to as the 'Well Spoken Man' after failing to recognise him), comedians Alan Davies and Jimmy Carr, rock stars Rick Wakeman and Justin Hawkins, footballer Les Ferdinand, and actor Trevor Eve who topped the time at 1 minute 47.0 seconds. Jimmy Carr, who held second place in the Liana behind Ellen MacArthur, spun off while doing his timed lap and got the second slowest time ever around the track at 2 minutes, 8.91 seconds.

On 28 January 2007, Jamie Oliver posted a time of 1:47.70 in melted snow and standing water. Given the rivalry Oliver felt towards fellow celebrity chef, and the lapboard leader, Gordon Ramsay, Oliver asked that the 4-second allowance normally granted for wet laps be used to put him at the top of the leaderboard "just for a day".

Actress Billie Piper posted a time of 1:48.3 but was deemed by The Stig to have failed to complete a lap properly, as she failed to negotiate some corners. The Stig suggested a three-second time penalty, but after Clarkson consulted the audience, it was decided to let the time stand, which her Doctor Who co-star, David Tennant, tried to overturn on 23 December 2007 show, at the end of the following series. Clarkson remarked that if Tennant had worn a see through top (like Piper for her interview), he "would have been faster than Simon Cowell".

In the 11 November 2007 episode, Simon Cowell retook his status as the holder of the fastest lap with a time of 1:45.90. According to Clarkson, the cameramen said they had never seen such consistency in the practice laps. However, Cowell was knocked off the top spot in Series 11 by Jay Kay, who now holds the fastest time in the Lacetti, although Clarkson selected the fastest of Jay Kay's times rather than the last run, which was slower than Cowell's time, seemingly due to a dislike of Cowell (he claimed earlier in the episode that Cowell had been at the top of the leaderboard for too long). Had this not happened, Cowell would have been knocked off the top by Grand Designs host Kevin McCloud.

Clarkson has referred to the part of the board with times of 1:51 and over as the 'Thespian Zone' due to the propensity for classically trained actors to post slow times.

Series 11 featured a slight change to the format, with two 'Stars' per episode instead of the previous one (although there had been a couple of editions in previous series' with more than one guest). Each of the pair are professionally associated with their fellow guest, usually both either act in or present the same TV show.  Unlike previous episodes where two stars have appeared, the stars drove individual laps without the other present in the car.

On 28 March 2010, Richard Hammond attended the demolition of the two 550 ft chimneys at Lafarge Cement's Northfleet Works. On the first episode of Series 15, it was shown that the Lacetti was partially crushed by placing it in the path of one of the falling chimneys.

Lacetti leaderboard

Kia Cee'd (2010–2013)
In the last episode of the fourteenth series of the show, Clarkson revealed that they were thinking about getting a new Reasonably Priced Car for the next series. On 27 June, during the first episode of the fifteenth series, it was revealed to be the Kia Cee'd and, as with the Chevrolet Lacetti, another open day was held to welcome the new car. Nick Robinson, Peter Jones, Al Murray, Bill Bailey, Peta Todd, Louie Spence, Johnny Vaughan and Amy Williams were among the initial drivers. Clarkson commonly refers to the Kia phonetically as the "Cee-apostrophe-d". Sophie Raworth, Bill Turnbull and Fiona Bruce all did the Star in a Reasonably Priced Car for Children in Need 2012.

Cee'd leaderboard

Vauxhall Astra (2013–2015)
In the first episode of series 20, Clarkson, Hammond and May revealed their new Reasonably Priced Car: a Vauxhall Astra 1.6 Tech Line. In similar fashion to earlier "new starts", an open day was held for multiple stars to drive the car. Following the abrupt end of Series 22 as a result of Clarkson's dismissal from the show, the Astra was returned to Vauxhall before being auctioned off for charity on 27 December 2015 for £17,800.

Astra leaderboard

F1 drivers (2002–2015)
All Formula One drivers are put into their own list with regard to lap times because of their exceptional skill level. When the Liana was pulled out from retirement to allow Jenson Button to make a time, Clarkson noted that the Liana would be pulled out for use by Formula 1 drivers in the future. The original 'black' Stig and the first 'white' Stig have done laps around the track in the Suzuki Liana. Both had their times removed from the leaderboard upon their departure.

The first Stig was Perry McCarthy, who once test drove for the Williams F1 team, and drove for the ill-fated Andrea Moda Formula One team.  The second Stig was Ben Collins; in the first episode of Series 13 the Stig was "revealed" to be Michael Schumacher, although this was a joke in the vein of the rest of his appearance on the show.

On 6 July 2011, Sebastian Vettel managed to top the board with a time of 1:44.0. Vettel's lap was the first time someone taking a 'Formula One drivers' line through the first corner was able to top The Stig's time, as Rubens Barrichello took the tighter line. Clarkson also mentioned on this episode that the current Stig has yet to do a lap of the track in the Liana, therefore there is currently no time on the board for the Stig. On 17 February 2013, Lewis Hamilton returned to do a dry lap and lowered the F1 Drivers record by 1.1s to 1:42.9. This was in the wake of his move to Mercedes AMG for the 2013 season. On 8 February 2015, Daniel Ricciardo topped the board with a lap time of 1:42.2. Ricciardo took the tighter line through the first corner, claiming that it covered less distance.

F1 Liana leaderboard

Star in a Rallycross Car (series 23)
For series 23, "Star in a Reasonably Priced Car" was renamed as "Star in a Rally-Cross Car" segment, with the track expanded to include a "Rallycross" route, featuring the addition of a jump and a water splash obstacle, but retaining the use of some of the corners. Two celebrities were invited to partake in setting a fast lap time with the use of a Mini Rallycross Car. This segment was used only in this series, as following Chris Evans' resignation, it was scrapped due to negative feedback.

Mini Rallycross leaderboard

Star in a Reasonably Fast Car (series 24–28)

Toyota GT86 (2017–2020)
Starting from the twenty-fourth series, the basic format of "Star in a Reasonably Priced Car" was revived following the axing of the rally-cross format, though the name was changed to "Star in a Reasonably Fast Car" due to the use of a more powerful Toyota GT86. Both The Stig and Chris Harris instructing the celebrities on driving the car around the track. Footage of several celebrities who drove the car before the first episode of the twenty-fourth series, was aired on spin-off programme Extra Gear.

GT86 leaderboard

Maps
 TopGear.com map and guide to the test track
 TopGearbox.com test track guide

Appearance in games
On 24 October 2007, it was announced that players of the PlayStation 3 game, Gran Turismo 5 Prologue, would be able to download episodes of Top Gear within the game, and that the test track would be one of the included circuits in the full game (Gran Turismo 5).

A very basic yet driveable version of the track appeared around 2003 for the PC racing simulation Grand Prix Legends. There is also a version of the test track for the realistic PC racing simulation rFactor, produced with permission from Dunsfold park. The track has also been produced as an add-on for World Racing 2. and the realistic racing simulator Assetto Corsa.

Top Gear have also added a basic version of the test track on the games section of their own website, with the title of "Be a star in our reasonably priced car". A Top Gear mobile phone game also features the track.

The game Gran Turismo 5, developed by Polyphony Digital features a fully rendered version of the Top Gear track. Players have the ability to drive and race on the track.

The track also appeared in Forza Motorsport 4; the Top Gear logo appeared in a trailer for the game on the Top Gear website. Cars were shown racing in the follow-through section during the E3 2011 trailer.  It is known that in the actual game there are options to race on the full track, race both of the rings in separate races and race on Top Gears drag race mile. There is also an achievement for completing a lap of the Top Gear Test Track in the Kia Cee'd fittingly named "Star in a reasonably priced car".

Forza Motorsport 4 sequel, Forza Motorsport 5, also features the Top Gear test track. The track layouts from Forza Motorsport 4 return, with the exception of the drag race mile, which has been removed. Subsequent games in the series, Forza Motorsport 6 and Forza Motorsport 7, also feature the Top Gear Test Track, with the full track and both separated rings. In these versions, the rings are able to be raced in reverse layout as well, and in both dry and wet conditions. 

The track also appears in the mobile game Top Gear – Extreme Parking, and in Automation – The Car Company Tycoon Game  as "Airport Track" for players to test their cars on.

Notes

References

Motorsport venues in England
Sports venues in Surrey
Test Track
Road test tracks